Serinyayla is a village in the District of Haymana, Ankara Province, Turkey.

References

Villages in Haymana District